Tissa Balasuriya (Sinhala: තිස්ස බාලසූරිය) (August 29, 1924 – January 17, 2013) was a Sri Lankan Roman Catholic priest and theologian. He was educated at St Patrick's College, Jaffna.

Theological work 
In 1971 Balasuriya founded the Center for Society and Religion; four years later he founded the Ecumenical Association of Third World Theologians. In 1990, Balasuriya published the book Mary and Human Liberation. In 1994, the Sri Lankan bishops warned that the book included heretical content because it misrepresented the doctrine of original sin and cast serious doubts on the divinity of Christ. Balasuriya submitted a 55-page theological defense to the Congregation for the Doctrine of the Faith, which rejected it.

Doctrinal investigation 
In May 1996, the Congregation demanded that he sign a profession of faith, apparently written exclusively for him, stating that he would "adhere with religious submission of will and intellect to the teachings of the Roman pontiff," even those teachings not proclaimed as definitive.

Excommunication 
Balasuriya responded by signing a different profession of faith composed by Pope Paul VI, adding a caveat that he was signing it "in the context of theological development and church practice since Vatican II and the freedom and responsibility of Christians and theological searchers under canon law." Cardinal Joseph Ratzinger ruled that the caveat rendered the profession "defective." Balasuriya appealed directly to the Pope, but was excommunicated on 2 January 1997, with the Pope's approval.

Lifting of excommunication 
Balasuriya then appealed to the Apostolic Signatura but was told that his case could not go forward. He subsequently agreed to drop the caveat from his profession of faith, and after intense international publicity and six days of negotiations, the excommunication was rescinded in January 1998. Although Balasuriya did not admit to doctrinal error, he did acknowledge "perceptions of error" and agreed to submit all future writings to his bishops for the imprimatur.

Death 
Balasuriya died in Colombo on January 17, 2013, aged 89.
He had been suffering from illness for some time. His funeral was due to take place on January 18, 2013, at the General Cemetery in Borella after Mass at the Fatima Church.

See also
Balangoda Ananda Maitreya Thero
Marcelline Jayakody
W.D. Amaradeva
Sisira Senaratne

References

External links 
 Fr. Tissa Balasuriya's reconciliation
 The excommunication of Fr. Tissa Balasuriya is lifted
  - A critique of Pope Benedict XVI's social justice Encyclical Caritas in Veritate (2009)
  Fr. Tissa Balasuriya obituary

1924 births
2013 deaths
Alumni of St. Patrick's College, Jaffna
People from British Ceylon
People temporarily excommunicated by the Catholic Church
20th-century Sri Lankan Roman Catholic priests
Dissident Roman Catholic theologians
Sinhalese priests